Indian Trader was launched in 1791. She made one voyage for the British East India Company (EIC). She was on her second voyage when a French privateer captured her. The British recaptured her and she returned to merchant service, sailing to the Americas. She was lost .

Career
Indian Trader entered Lloyd's Register in 1792 with John Edwards, master, Brickwood, owner, and trade London–Montreal.

Lloyd's Register for 1794 showed Indian Traders master changing from Edwards to Dunlop, and her trade from London–Montreal to London–Bengal.

On 1 May 1794 Captain David Dunlop acquired a letter of marque. Before she was ready for a voyage for the EIC, Wells repaired her. On 25 June Gilbert Ferguson and William Gillett certified to the EIC's Court of Directors that before she, and seven other vessels, had left the Thames, "everything was done, that in our opinion was necessary, to make them sufficiently strong to bring home a cargo from India".

Dunlop sailed from Portsmouth on 11 June, bound for Bengal. However, Indian Trader was detained there for over a month. She did not reach Falmouth until 14 August. She was at Madeira on 5 September, and arrived at Calcutta 15 February 1795. Homeward bound, she was at Diamond Harbour on 14 April, reached St Helena on 25 August. On 3 September she sailed from St Helena. Indian Trader arrived at the Downs on 24 November.

Captain Edmund Barker acquired a letter of marque on 5 May 1796. He sailed for Bengal on 15 May. However, in November the French captured her in the South Atlantic. Her captors sent her into Cayenne. The EIC had no cargo aboard.

In 1797  recaptured Indian Trader as Indian Trader was sailing from Cayenne to Baltimore. Thetis sent her into Halifax, Nova Scotia.

Indian Trader returned to Lloyd's Register in the 1798 volume. Her master was Manlove, her owner was M. Benson, and her trade was Liverpool–Jamaica. Captain Joseph Manlove acquired a letter of marque on 18 June 1798. Lloyd's List reported on 18 July 1800 that Indian Trader, Manlove, master, had sailed from Jamaica for Liverpool, but had to return because of damage to her masts.

Captain James Corless acquired a letter of marque on 26 August 1801. D. Sheepe replaced him according to Lloyd's Register for 1803.

The data below is from the Register of Shipping.

On 26 September 1815 Indian Trader, Lea, master, ran aground at Liverpool while returning from Jamaica. She was got off, reportedly without damage.

On 6 July 1821 Indian Trader sailed from Belfast with 200 migrants. She arrived at Quebec on 21 August.

On 31 May 1823, Indian Trader was at Sierra Leone when a lightning strike destroyed her mainmast.

Lloyd's List reported on 21 December 1827 that Maria had damaged Indian Trader.

On 13 January 1828 a gale drove Jessie Lawson into Indian Trader. Jessie Lawson then ran aground and was wrecked in Mountbatten Bay. All on board survived. Jessie Lawson was on a voyage from London to Van Diemen's Land.

Fate
On 26 October 1829 a steamboat towed Indian Trader into Stockholm. Indian Trader had been sailing from "Laguna"  to St Pertersburg when she had struck on Gothland. It was expected that Indian Trader would be condemned.

The Register of Shipping for 1831 has the notation "LOST" by her name. Lloyd's Register continued to carry Indian Trader with stale data until 1833.

Notes

Citations

References
 
 
  
Proceedings Relative to Ships Tendered for the Service of the United East-India Company, from the Twenty-sixth of March, 1794, to the Sixth of January, 1795: With an Appendix.

1791 ships
Age of Sail merchant ships of England
Ships of the British East India Company
Captured ships
Migrant ships to Canada
Maritime incidents in January 1828
Maritime incidents in October 1829